Barton U. A. Scotland is a Guyanese politician and former diplomat. He has served as Speaker of the National Assembly of Guyana from 10 June 2015 to 1 September 2020.

Scotland formerly worked in the Ministry of Foreign Affairs as a senior diplomat and advisor. He was also the head of the Department of International Economic Co-operation, and a Commissioner on the Caricom Competition Commission. A lawyer, Scotland holds Master of Laws and PhD (international law) degrees from the University of London.

References

Guyanese politicians
Speakers of the National Assembly (Guyana)
Year of birth missing (living people)
Living people
Guyanese diplomats